The Engine Company No. 1 in Pittsburgh, Pennsylvania was located at 344 Boulevard of the Allies in downtown Pittsburgh, and  Engine Company No. 30 is located directly behind it, on the other side of the building, at 341 First Avenue.  Built around 1900, architect William Y. Brady, the Boulevard of the Allies facade is Beaux Arts and Classical in design, and the First Avenue facade mixes Romanesque and Classical styles.  Both were added to the List of City of Pittsburgh historic designations (together, as a single listing) on March 17, 1993.

In 2011 the city sold the closed station to Point Park University.

References

Fire stations on the National Register of Historic Places in Pennsylvania
Government buildings in Pittsburgh
Beaux-Arts architecture in Pennsylvania
Neoclassical architecture in Pennsylvania
Romanesque Revival architecture in Pennsylvania
Fire stations completed in 1900
National Register of Historic Places in Pittsburgh
Point Park University